Toussaint Prévost, known under the pseudonym Théodore Ritter (5 April 1840 – 6 April 1886) was a 19th-century French composer and pianist.

Biography
The son of composer Eugène Prévost, he was a student of Hector Berlioz. He began his career as a baritone singer at La Monnaie in Brussels under the name Félix, then studied the piano with Franz Liszt. He quickly became a renowned pianist and began an international career under the name "Théodore Ritter".

A member of the "Société des derniers concerts de Beethoven" (1860), he undertook a concert tour in Canada and the US with the violinist Frantz Jehin-Prume and the operatic singer Carlotta Patti in 1869–1870.

Among others, he was the teacher of Isidore Philipp and Samuel Sanford.

Married with the singer Alice Desgranges; his niece Gabrielle Ritter-Ciampi was also famous as a singer.

A chevalier of the Légion d'honneur (1880), he is buried at cimetière du Père-Lachaise (20th division)

He composed numerous pieces for piano and transcriptions, as well as piano versions of L'enfance du Christ and Roméo et Juliette by Berlioz .

Bibliography
 Émile Maillard: Nantes et le département au XIXe siècle (1891), p. 199, .
 Henry Charles Lahee: Famous pianists of today and yesterday (1901), p. 335, .
 Georges d'Heylli: Dictionnaire des pseudonymes (1977), p. 377–378, .

References

External links
 Théodore Ritter on Data.bnf.fr

1840 births
1886 deaths
19th-century classical composers
Burials at Père Lachaise Cemetery
Chevaliers of the Légion d'honneur
19th-century French male classical pianists
French male classical composers
French Romantic composers
Musicians from Nantes